The Senate of the Republic of Kenya is one of the two Houses of the Parliament of Kenya, along with the National Assembly.  The Senate was first established as part of Kenya's 1963 Constitution.  

After being abolished in 1966, the Senate was re-established by Article 93 of the new 2010 Constitution to represent counties' interests as well as pass legislation concerning counties.

First Senate, 1963–1966
Kenya's 1963 Constitution established a Senate that consisted of 41 senators elected for six years, with one-third of the members retiring every two years. Timothy Chokwe served as the first speaker of the Senate. The Senate was abolished in 1966, when its membership was combined with that of the House of Representatives to form a unicameral legislature, the National Assembly.

Members of the first Senate (1963–1966)

Modern Senate, 2013–present

The 2013 General Election took place on 4 March 2013. Under the new Constitution, which was passed during the 2010 Referendum, the 2013 general election was the first to include the election of Senators representing the 47 newly created counties. They were also the first general elections run by the Independent Electoral and Boundaries Commission. 

According to their share of elected seats, the political parties nominated an additional 16 women. Additional nominations were made for two members representing the youth and two members representing Persons Living with Disabilities (PLWD). The Speaker of the Senate, who is an ex officio member, is elected by the Senators sworn in on the first Sitting of the Senate.

Powers
The powers and role of the Senate in Kenya are as follows:
 Empowered to represent the interests of the counties and their governments
 Participates in law-making by considering, debating and approving bills concerning counties
 Determines allocation of national revenue among counties.
 Has powers of impeachment over the president, deputy president, county governor, and deputy governors

Members of the Senate from 2017 to 2022

Elected senators

Source: Kenyan Parliament (2020)

Members of the Senate from 2022 to 2027

Elected senators

Members of the senate between 2013 and 2017
The Senate consists of 47 members directly elected by their counties, 16 women nominated by the political parties according to their relative strength in the Senate elections, two members to represent the youth, and two members to represent persons with disabilities.

Elected senators

Women Nominated to the senate 2022-2027

Women nominated to the senate between 2013-2017

Members nominated to senate to represent youth

Members nominated to senate to represent people with disabilities

Summary by coalition and party between 2013 and 2017
These summaries are based on post-election coalitions as reported by the press.

Committees
Committees 2022 -
 Senate committee on Health
Chairperson: Jackson Mandago 
Vice Chair:Mariam Omar Sheikh
 Senate Budget and Finance committee
Chairperson: Ali Roba
Vice Chair: Tabitha Mutinda
 Senate Committee on Information, Communication and Technology
Chairperson: Allan Chesang
Vice Chair: Gloria Orwoba
 Senate Committee on Justice, Legal And Human Rights 
Chairperson: Hillary Sigei
Vice Chair: Raphael Chimera
 Senate Committee on Labour and Social Welfare Committee
Chairperson:  Julius Murgor
Vice Chair: John Mbugua
 Senate Committee on Agriculture, Livestock and Fisheries
Chairperson: James Murango
Vice Chair: Alexander Mundigi
 Senate Committee on Devolution and Intergovernmental Relations
Chairperson:  Sheikh Mohamed Abass
Vice Chair: Rosalinda Tuya
 Senate Committee on Education
Chairperson: Joseph Nyutu
Vice Chair:Peris Tobiko
 Senate Committee on Energy 
Chairperson: Wahome Wamatinga
Vice Chair:Veronicah NduatiCommittees 2013- 2022' Senate Rules and Business CommitteeChair: Ekwee Ethuro
 Senate Committee on Education, Information and TechnologyChair: Mutahi Kagwe (NARC)Vice Chair: Mohamud Halima Abdille (ODM)
 Senate Committee on Energy, Roads and TransportationChair: Gideon Moi (KANU)Vice Chair: Mwakulegwa Danson Mwazo (ODM)
 Senate Committee on Finance, Commerce and Economic AffairsChair: Billow Kerrow (URP)Vice Chair: Peter Mositet (TNA)
 Senate Committee on Health, Labour and Social WelfareChair: Mohammed Kuti (URP)Vice Chair: Kittony Zipporah (KANU)
 Senate Committee on Legal Affairs and Human RightsChair: Amos Wako (ODM)Vice Chair: Sang Stephen (URP)
 Senate Committee on National Security and Foreign RelationsChair: Yusuf Haji (TNA)Vice Chair: Dullo Fatuma (URP)
 Senate Committee on Agriculture, Land and Natural ResourcesChair: Kivuti Lenny (APK)Vice Chair: George Khaniri (UDF)
 Senate Delegated Legislation CommitteeChair: Kisasa Mshenga Mvita (URP)Vice Chair: Sijeny Judith Achieng (WDM-K)
 Senate Implementation CommitteeChair: James Orengo (ODM)Vice Chair: Kanainza Nyongesa Daisy (ODM)
 Senate Devolved Government CommitteeChair: Murkomen Kipchumba (URP)Vice Chair'': Wangari Martha (UDF)

References

 
K
1963 establishments in Kenya
1966 disestablishments in Kenya
2013 establishments in Kenya